Oujda is a major Moroccan city in its northeast near the border with Algeria. Oujda is the capital city of the Oriental region of northeastern Morocco and has a population of about 558,000 people.

History

Origins 
There is some evidence of a settlement during the Roman occupation, which seems to have been under the control of Berbers rather than Romans.

The city was founded in 994 by Ziri ibn Atiyya, Berber chief of the Zenata Maghrawa tribe. Ziri was, with his tribe, authorized to occupy the region of Fas, but feeling insecure in that region and that town, and wishing to be nearer to the central Maghrib homeland of his tribe, he moved to Ouajda, installed there a garrison and his possessions, appointing one of his relatives as governor.

11th to 19th centuries 
In the mid-11th century, a new quarter with a wall was allegedly added to the primitive core. Yusuf ibn Tashfin occupied the city in 1079, and in the next century, it came under Almohad control, with its fortifications repaired and strengthened under the Almohad caliph Muhammad al-Nasir.

Oujda played an important strategic role between the Marinids, based in Fes, and the Abdalwadids of the Kingdom of Tlemcen. The Marinid sultan Abu Yusuf Yaqub destroyed the city when he defeated Sultan Yaghmorasan in 1271. When his successor Abu Yaqub Yusuf conquered the city again in 1296, he destroyed the remaining fortifications but then rebuilt the town with the new walls, a palace, and a Great Mosque (the current one). The town continued to change hands, however. Around 1325, Sultan Abu al-Hasan took the city again during a series of campaigns which extended Marinid control into the central Maghreb for a brief period.

Because of its frontier position, the city was frequently contested between the Sharifian dynasties of Morocco – the Saadis, followed by the Alaouites – to the west and the Ottoman Empire to the east, from the 16th century onward. It was often attached to the province or region of Tlemcen, which itself also changed hands several times in this period. During the long reign of Moulay Isma'il (1672–1727), Oujda was firmly under Alaouite control and defended by new fortifications and garrisons built by the sultan. After Isma'il's death, however, political instability returned. It was only in 1795 that the city was retaken by the Alaouite empire and permanently incorporated into Morocco.

The French occupied it in 1844 and again in 1859. To the west of the city is the site of the Battle of Isly which occurred in 1844. In 1907-1908, Oujda was reconquered by General Bugeaud and Marshal Lyautey and used as a French military base to control eastern Morocco. The modern city owes much of its present form to the French, who developed along the roads built at that time.

20th century and present day 
Anti-Jewish riots occurred in Oujda June 1948, during the 1948 Palestine war in the aftermath of the establishment of the State of Israel. Oujda, located near the border, was a departure point for Moroccan Jews seeking to reach Israel by crossing into French Algeria; at the time they were not permitted to do so from within Morocco. In the events, 47 Jews and a French person were killed, many were injured, and property was damaged.

The 1953 Oujda revolt took place during Thami El Glaoui's attempted coup against Sultan Muhammad V.

In 1954, from the beginning of the Algerian Independence War, Morocco allowed Oujda to become the logistic center of the Oujda Group.

The Moroccan border with Algeria is just east of Oujda; on the other side of the border is the Algerian town of Maghnia. The border has been closed since 1994. 

In 2010, Rod Solaimani chronicled his trip to Oujda for MTV.

Geography

 south from city centre, is Jbel Hamra, a typical Mediterranean forest and into the east of this forest is Sidi Maafa park.

Oujda is located in the south of Beni Znassen mountains.

Climate
The city has a cold semi-arid climate (Köppen climate classification BSk). It rarely snows in winter; last snowfall was on 5 February 2012. Weather in Oujda is cool but still tepid and wet in winter, hot and dry in summer.

Architecture

The main characteristic of the city is having the old city in the centre. The old city maintains traditional features of the Moroccan architecture with its narrow, winding alleys which lead to the houses and markets such as the jewelry market and the leather market. The Grand Mosque of Oujda is one of its historically most important mosques.

Bled el Gaada is a Roman era ruins just outside of Ouijda. The ruins consist of a Roman Castra fort 175m by 210m.

Music

Gharnati refers to a variety of music originating in Andalusia. Its name was derived from the Arabic name of the Spanish city of Granada. Gharnati constitutes the musical mode mostly used in Oujda, where besides this musical kind is omnipresent and where each year in June the International Festival of Gharnati music is held.

Reggada Music is a major traditional music movement. Its a Moroccan Amazigh ancient musical genre and traditional war dance from the Beni Znassen/Aït Iznasen tribes of north-east Morocco (Provinces of Oujda, Berkane and Taourirt), more precisely coming from the village called Ain-Reggada. This dance used to celebrate and emulate victory of a battle. This music has now become part of the global music sphere.

Oujda is also famous by the music of Raï.

Subdivisions
The province is divided administratively into the following:

Transport
Tourists aiming at Saïdia, bordering the Mediterranean, transit to Oujda's airport. The city is served by Angads Airport, which has connecting international flights to Lisbon, Brussels, Madrid, Marseille or Paris for example, as well as domestic flights to Casablanca.

The city is the endpoint of the main railroad from Casablanca via Fes and Taourirt before the border with Algeria. There are several day and night trains to and from the city, linking it to the western part of the country. 

The Oriental Desert Express was originally built in the 1920s and 1930s as part of the Mediterranean–Niger Railway. One of its cars, the historical "prince's wagon" passenger car runs now twice annually. Outside camera shots of the Oriental Desert Express were featured in the 2015 James Bond film Spectre.

Economy

Oujda has a strategic importance because of its location on the border. There are many economic and natural resources, however, problems of overpopulation of the city and increase in unemployment rate up to 18% of the 11% on the national level has led to migration to foreign countries go up to 28.3% of the national total.

Oujda relies heavily on trading given its location near the borders of Algeria. The economy of the city is directly related to the border's condition as it represents a passage for businesses directed towards Fes in the west, Talmasan in the east, Figuig in the south and Melilla in the north. 

On 18 March 2003, King Mohammed VI indicated the importance of reviving the economy of the Eastern regions of Morocco. In the context of this effort, Technopol Oujda was established and the region witnessed road improvement, airport expansion and other projects.

Sport

The sports infrastructure in Oujda is composed of a municipal stadium, an Olympic venue, the Honneur Stadium of Oujda, built in 1976, the sports complex 'Rock' including a rugby stadium, a complex tennis in the park Lala Aicha, a golf course and two sports halls.

Football
In 1957, MC Oujda (MCO) became the first football club to win the Throne Cup of Morocco, defeating the Wydad of Casablanca, a feat the club repeated the following year. In 1959, in its third successive appearance in the final, the club lost against FAR of Rabat. However, in MC Oujda's fourth successive final, the club defeated FUS Rabat. In 1962 MCO won its last Throne cup against the Kawkab Athletic Club of Marrakech.

After ten years, MC Oujda came back to win in 1972 the Maghreb Cup, three years after it won The Botola Pro of Morocco.

US Musulmane d'Oujda, is another football club in Oujda.

Notable people 

Arts & Cinema
Hafid Bouazza – Writer
Hamid Bouchnak – Moroccan raï singer and songwriter
Nathalie Delon – Actress and director
Douzi – Singer and songwriter
Les Freres Megri – Rock band very popular in the Arab world, composers and producers.
Philippe Faucon – Filmmaker
Fouad Laroui – Writer and economist
Michel Qissi – Actor
Mimoun El Oujdi – Raï singer
Younes Megri – Actor, singer author of 'Leli Touil' sung by Maria de Rossi & Boney M.
Abdelkrim Derkaoui – Cinematographer, film director and screenwriter
Bassouar Al Maghnaoui – Singer
Simon Basinger – Musicologist, essayist, producer and author.
Charlotte Slovack – Filmmaker
Douzi – Pop singer
Serge Guirao – Singer

Sports
Adil Belgaid – Olympic judo fighter (3 times World Champion, 6 times African Champion, 3 times Arab Champion, 3 times Olympian)
Abdelatif Benazzi – Rugby player
Philippe Casado – Cyclist
Abdelkarim Kissi – Footballer
Soufiane Kourdou – Professional basketball player
Moha Rharsalla – Footballer
Mohammed Qissi – Actor (Kickboxer, Bloodsport with Jean Claude Vandamme)
Mohcin Cheaouri – Track and Field athlete, 2 times African champion
Yahya Berrabah – Olympic athlete, African champion in long jump
Daniel Sanchez – Footballer
Gilles Simon – Formula 1
Ahmed Belkedroussi – Football manager
Khadfi Rharsallah – Footballer
Marianne Agulhon – Slalom canoeist
Mohammed Berrabeh – International footballer
Hassan Alla – Footballer
Mohammed Ben Brahim – Footballer
Khalid Chalqi – Footballer
Gerard Soler – Footballer midfielder
Khalid Lebji – Footballer midfielder
Abou El Kacem Hadji – Footballer
Ryad El Alami – Footballer
Abdelah Kafifi – Footballer
Mohamed Atmani – Boxer (Summer Olympics)
Soufiane Kourdou – Basketball player
Houssam Amaanan – Footballer
Habib Allah Dahmani – Footballer

Politics & Diplomats
Ahmed Osman – Former Prime Minister, married King Hassan II's sister, Lalla Nuzha of Morocco
Zoulikha Nasri – Advisor to King Mohammed IV, MD of foundation 'Mohammed V for Solidarity'
Muhammad Ben Abdessalam Al Muqri – Late 19th senior official, advisor and grand vizier to several sultans.
Abdelkader Lecheheb – Football player and Ambassador to Russia
Mohamed Allal Sinaceur – Former Minister of Cultural Affairs
Mohamed Habib Sinaceur – Politician
Ahmed Toufiq Hejira – Former Minister of Housing and Urbanism
Kaddour El Ouartassi – Historian
Najima Rhozali – Politician, professor
Yvette Katan Bensamoun – Historian
Omar Benjelloun – Journalist
Abdelaziz Bouteflika – (1937–2021), 5th President of Algeria
Abdelnour Abbrous – Politician
Chakib Khelil – Politician
Hassnae Bouazza – Journalist, writer, columnist
Louisette Ighilariz – Politician

Business
Maurice Levy – French businessman, Chairman of Publicis Group.

Town twinning 

  Trowbridge, UK, (2009) Trowbridge has the largest Moroccan community in the UK outside London, and is the first UK town to be twinned with a place from a Muslim country. At the time, Trowbridge had approximately 80 resident families who had roots in Oujda. 
 Lille, France
 Sevran, France
 Jouy-le-Moutier, France
 Aix-en-Provence, France (2007)
 Jeddah, Saudi Arabia
 Sirte, Libya
 Oran, Algeria
 Sint-Jans-Molenbeek, Belgium

See also 
 Oujda group - an Algerian political faction named after the town

References

External links 

 Oujda Portal
 Oujdays 100% Oujda
 Oujda and its region
 Entry in Lexicorient
 OujdaCity.net

 
Regional capitals in Morocco
Prefecturial capitals in Morocco
Municipalities of Morocco